Paula Lane (born 17 April 1986) is an English actress. She is known for portraying the role of Kylie Platt in the ITV soap opera Coronation Street from 2010 to 2016.

Early life
Lane is originally from Hebden Bridge near Halifax. Lane attended Catholic High School in Halifax and then Huddersfield Technical College. At the age of 19 she was accepted to train at the prestigious Central School of Speech and Drama in London, graduating in 2008 with a 1st class honours degree in acting. On finishing drama school, Lane was cast immediately in the ITV 1960s-based drama  Heartbeat where she made her television debut playing a teacher, Wendy Kelshaw, in the episode 'School Of Hard Knocks'.

Career
Lane made her professional acting debut in Heartbeat in 2009. Since then she has appeared in Going Postal by Terry Pratchett for Sky, The Royal and Doctors. Lane was also featured in the short film War Wounds alongside Stephen Mangan.

Coronation Street
Lane joined Coronation Street in 2010, portraying Kylie Platt, half-sister of established character Becky McDonald (Katherine Kelly).

She departed her role as Kylie Platt in 2014, when she left for maternity leave. Lane returned in June 2015. On 9 February 2016, it was confirmed that Lane was to leave for maternity leave for her second pregnancy but this time she would not be returning and she would leave the soap permanently. Her character was killed off in episodes aired on 15 July 2016. The last episode in which she appeared aired on 20 July 2016.

Theatre
Lane has also acted in several stage productions. She has played the role of Rachel in Be More Martyn at Southwark Playhouse, Lily in The Bengal Lily at Manchester Royal Exchange, Lauren in the UK tour of Kinky Boots. and most recently appeared in Road at Oldham Coliseum.

Personal life
Lane married her long-term partner Tom Shaw in May 2014 at Leeds Cathedral. They have a son and a daughter. Tom has also appeared in Coronation Street in 2017 and 2018 as Kim on a recurring basis.

Filmography

Awards and nominations

References

External links
 

Living people
English soap opera actresses
English stage actresses
Actresses from Yorkshire
English television actresses
Alumni of the Royal Central School of Speech and Drama
People from Hebden Bridge
1986 births